David R Cole (born 1967) is an Australian researcher in the fields of literacies, globalization, critical thinking, the philosophy of education and Gilles Deleuze. He is currently employed by the University of Western Sydney as Associate Professor in Literacies, English and ESL in the Centre for Educational Research as the Globalisation theme leader.

Cole studied at the University of Liverpool, Bath Spa University and the University of Warwick. He started working in Australia in teacher education at the University of Tasmania (2004-2007) and lectured at the University of Technology, Sydney (2008-2011).

Research
Cole's approach is to treat educational phenomena as a form of material analysis. In so doing, he applies concepts derived from the work of Gilles Deleuze and Félix Guattari to the in-depth study of educational processes that simultaneously works on the micro and macro levels. He has recently been using 'immanent materialism' in this context and been developing a new approach to educational methodology since 1996.

Selected publications

Literacy and education
 Multiliteracies in Motion: Current Theory and Practice, with Darren Pullen, Routledge (2009) 
 Multiple Literacies Theory: A Deleuzian Perspective, with Diana Masny, Sense Publishers (2009) 
 Multiliteracies and Technology Enhanced Education: Social Practice and the Global Classroom, with Darren Pullen (2009) 
 The Political Philosophy of Eric Voegelin and His Followers: A Criticism of the Voegelinians (2009) 
 Educational Life-Forms: Deleuzian Teaching and Learning Practice, Sense Publishers (2011) 
 Surviving Economic Crises Through Education, Peter Lang (2012) 
 The Power In / Of Language (Educational Philosophy and Theory Special Issues), with Linda J. Graham, Wiley-Blackwell (2012) 
 Mapping Multiple Literacies: An Introduction to Deleuzian Literacy Studies, with Diana Masny, Continuum (2012) 
 Traffic Jams: Analysing Everyday Life Through the Immanent Materialism of Deleuze & Guattari, Punctum Books (2013) 
 Education and the Politics of Becoming, with Diana Masny, Routledge (2014) 
 Capitalised Education: An immanent materialist account of Kate Middleton, Zero Books (2014)

Novel
 A Mushroom of Glass, Sid Harta Publishers (2009)

References

External links
 University of Tasmania ePrints
 Multiple Literacies Theory: A Deleuzian Perspective page
 Multiliteracies and Technology Enhanced Education: Social Practice and the Global Classroom page
  Multiliteracies in motion: Current theory and practice 

Living people
Australian educational theorists
Place of birth missing (living people)
1967 births